Elise or Elyse  may refer to:

Arts and entertainment
 Elise, the unidentified person to whom Beethoven dedicated Für Elise
 Elise, a 1979 speculative fiction novel by Ken Grimwood
 Élise ou la vraie vie (Elise, or the Real Life), a 1967 novel by the French writer Claire Etcherelli
 Élise ou la vraie vie (Elise, or Real Life), a 1970 French drama film based on the novel of the same name
 Elyse (film), a 2020 American drama film
 "Elise", an episode of the British television programme Foyle's War

People and fictional characters
 Élise, a list of people and fictional characters with the given name Élise, Elise, Elize, or Elyse
 Christine Elise (born 1965), American actress
 Kimberly Elise, (born 1967), American actress
 Lily Elise (born 1991), American singer and songwriter
 Elise Kuhn (born 2006), American singer and songwriter

Transportation
 Lotus Elise, a British sports car
 Steam ship Élise, the first steamboat to cross the English Channel
 Trekking Elise, a French paraglider design

See also
 "Fur Elise", a famous Beethoven song composed in 1810
 Elize (given name)
 Elisa (disambiguation)
 Alise (disambiguation)
 Lise (disambiguation)